Government of Alfonso Fernández Mañueco may refer to:

First government of Alfonso Fernández Mañueco (2019–2022)
Second government of Alfonso Fernández Mañueco (TBD 2022)